The Estádio Cidade de Barcelos is a multi-use stadium in Barcelos, Portugal.  It is currently used mostly for football matches. It is the home of Primeira Liga side Gil Vicente.

The stadium is able to hold 12,504 people and was built in 2004. It opened on 30 May 2004. The inaugural game saw Gil Vicente lose 2–1 to Uruguayan side Nacional de Montevideo. It replaced Estadio Adelino Ribeiro Novo which was Gil's home ground from  its establishment in the 1920s until 2004. The stadium is a UEFA Category C ground which allows for European and international games to be played there.

It held two matches of the 2006 UEFA European Under-21 Football Championship, Serbia & Montenegro 0–1 Germany and Portugal 0–2 Serbia & Montenegro.

Portugal national football team

The next national team match was held in the stadium.

References

External links
Stadium profile
Information about the Stadium

Barcelos
Gil Vicente F.C.
Sports venues in Braga District
Buildings and structures in Barcelos, Portugal
Sport in Barcelos, Portugal
Sports venues completed in 2004